This is a list of seasons played by Hapoel Petah Tikva Football Club in Israeli and European football, from 1934 (when the club was established) to the most recent completed season. It details the club's achievements in major competitions, and the top scorers for each season, if available. Top scorers in bold were also the top scorers in the Israeli league that season. Records of minor competitions such as the Lilian Cup are not included due to them being considered of less importance than the State Cup and the Toto Cup.

The club has won the six Israeli championships, two State Cups and four Toto cups, as well as several other minor trophies.

History
Hapoel Petah Tikva Football Club was established in 1934 and joined the EIFA and competed in its competitions ever since. The club played in Palestine League during the abandoned 1934–35 league season and rejoined the league at its lowest level, third division, during the 1937–38 season. The club was promoted to the top division ahead of the 1941–42 season and remained at this level until being relegated at the end of the 1975–76 season, winning six championships between 1955 and 1963. The club was among the first to represent Israel in UEFA competitions by qualifying to the 1992–93 European Cup Winners' Cup.

Seasons

Key

 P = Played
 W = Games won
 D = Games drawn
 L = Games lost
 F = Goals for
 A = Goals against
 Pts = Points
 Pos = Final position

 Premier = Ligat HaAl (Premier League) (1st tier since 2000)
 Leumit = Liga Leumit (1st tier 1955 to 2000; 2nd tier since 2000)
 Artzit = Liga Artzit  (2nd tier 1977 to 2000; 3rd tier 2000 to 2009)
 Alef = Liga Alef (1st tier 1947 to 1955; 2nd tier 1955 to 1977; 3rd tier 1977 to 2000 and since 2009)
 Pal. League = Palestine League

 R1 = Round 1
 R2 = Round 2
 R3 = Round 3
 R4 = Round 4
 R5 = Round 5
 R6 = Round 6
 R7 = Round 7
 R8 = Round 8
 R9 = Round 9
 QF = Quarter-finals
 SF = Semi-finals
 Group = Group stage

Notes

References
 Hapoel Petah Tikva Museum 

Hapoel Petah Tikva F.C.
 
Hapoel Petah Tikva